The 2009 Indian general election in Jharkhand, was held for 14 seats in the state.

Results

List of Elected MPs

Bye-election

References

Indian general elections in Jharkhand
Jharkhand
2000s in Jharkhand